The Dubai One Tower was a proposed megatall residential building in Dubai, United Arab Emirates. At  it would have been the tallest residential building in the world and the 4th tallest building in the world when completed. If built as planned, it would have featured 885 residential apartments and a five star hotel with 350 rooms.

See also
 List of tallest residential buildings in Dubai
 List of tallest buildings in Dubai
 List of buildings with 100 floors or more

References

Proposed skyscrapers in Dubai